The House by the Cemetery is a 1981 Italian horror film directed by Lucio Fulci. The film stars Catriona MacColl, Paolo Malco, Ania Pieroni, Giovanni Frezza, Silvia Collatina and Dagmar Lassander. Its plot revolves around a series of murders taking place in a New England home that happens to be hiding a gruesome secret within its basement walls.

Plot 
A woman is in an abandoned house looking for her boyfriend. After she discovers his body stabbed with scissors, she is stabbed in the head with a French knife, and her body is dragged through a cellar door by an unknown assailant.

In New York City, Bob Boyle and his parents, Norman and Lucy Boyle, are moving into the same house. Norman's ex-colleague, Dr. Peterson, who murdered his mistress before committing suicide, was the previous owner. The Boyles are to stay there while Norman researches old houses. As his mother packs, Bob looks at a house's photograph and notices a girl in it. In New Whitby, Boston, Bob waits in his parents' car while they collect the house keys. The girl from the photograph appears across the street. The girl, Mae Freudstein, whom only Bob can see, warns him to stay away. In the real estate office, Mrs. Laura Gittleson is annoyed when her colleague hands the couple "the Freudstein keys." She insists it is called "Oak Mansion" and promises to find the Boyles a babysitter.

Oak Mansion is in a poor state of repair. The cellar door is locked and nailed shut. A woman arrives and introduces herself as Ann, the babysitter. That night, Norman hears noises and finds Ann unblocking the cellar door. The next day, Norman goes to the library to peruse Peterson's materials. The chief librarian, Mr. Wheatley, appears to recognize him, but Norman claims he is mistaken. The assistant librarian, Daniel Douglas, then informs Norman that Peterson conducted private research at the house. He studied records of area disappearances and other demographic data.

Mae shows Bob a tombstone on the grounds marked "Mary Freudstein" and says she is not really buried there. Indoors, Lucy finds the tombstone of "Jacob Tess Freudstein" while sweeping the hallway. When Norman returns, he reassures her that some older houses have indoor tombs because of the hard wintry ground. Norman opens the cellar door and walks down the stairs, only to be attacked by a bat, which won't let go until he stabs it repeatedly. Spooked, the family drives down to the real estate office and demands to be re-housed but are told it will be a few more days before they can move. While the Boyles are at the hospital to treat Norman's injuries from the bat, Mrs. Gittleson arrives at the house to tell them of a new property. Letting herself in, she stands over the Freudstein tombstone, which cracks apart, pinning her ankle. A figure emerges, stabs her to death with a fireplace poker, and drags her into the cellar.

Lucy finds Ann cleaning a bloodstain on the kitchen floor the next morning. Ann eludes Lucy's questions about the stain. Over coffee, Norman tells Lucy that he has discovered that Freudstein was a Victorian surgeon who conducted illegal experiments. Norman must travel to New York to research Freudstein. On the way, Norman visits the library and finds an audio cassette of Peterson's, which documents Peterson's increasing madness and reveals what he discovered about Freudstein. Norman destroys the cassette by dropping it into a furnace pipe.

Ann goes to the cellar looking for Bob at the house and hears childlike sobbing sounds. Freudstein decapitates her after slashing her throat. Bob sees Ann's head and exits screaming. Lucy returns to find Bob crying in his room but refuses to believe Bob's account about Ann. That evening, Bob returns to the cellar looking for Ann but gets locked in. Lucy hears Bob's cries and tries to open the cellar door. Norman returns and hacks the door with a hatchet when she cannot open it. The rotting right hand of Dr. Freudstein appears and restrains Bob against the door as the hatchet chops through it. One of Norman's axe blows breaks through the door, severs the ghoul's seemingly ordinary left hand, and he staggers back down the stairs.

Norman and Lucy finally get into the cellar, which contains several mutilated bodies (including Ann, Mrs. Gittleson, and the couple from the beginning), surgical equipment, and a slab. Freudstein is a living corpse with rotting flesh. Norman tells Lucy that the 150-year-old Freudstein lives by using his victims' parts to regenerate blood cells. Norman attacks Freudstein, but the ghoul twists the hatchet away. Grabbing a knife from the slab, Norman stabs Freudstein, causing rotten flesh and maggots to ooze out of his old lab coat. Freudstein grabs Norman and rips open his throat. Lucy and Bob climb a ladder leading to the underside of the cracked tombstone. Lucy strains to shift the stone, but Freudstein grabs her and drags her down the stairs, killing her by ramming her head into the concrete floor. As Freudstein advances up the ladder, Bob strains to escape. As Freudstein grabs Bob's leg, he is suddenly pulled upwards by Mae. With Mae is her mother, Mary Freudstein, who tells them it's time to leave. Mrs. Freudstein leads Mae and Bob down the wintry grove into an apparent ghost world.

Cast

Production
Fulci later claimed that after making The Black Cat and The Beyond that he wanted to make a film in tribute to HP Lovecraft without the film being based on one of his stories, but written as if it existed within the universe. Screenwriter Dardano Sacchetti was inspired by Henry James' The Turn of the Screw. Sacchetti also stated the film was based on his own personal experiences as a child, being born in a large country house with a large dark basement and that age 9 he had to cross a cemetery at night. In his biography, Fulci spoke negatively about Sacchetti's contributions as a screenwriter saying that The House by the Cemetery was derivative of scenes from The House That Screamed. The film went through several changes from the original story by Elisa Briganti and the script by Sacchetti.  The script was originally titled La notte dell'inferno which became La casa di Freudstein and then Quella casa accanto al cimitero. Sacchetti's script was revised by Fulci and Giorgio Mariuzzo, Mariuzzo claimed he worked as a script doctor slightly changing work stating that Sacchetti's scripts were often too short. Sacchetti commented on this stating that "Mariuzzo always intervened afterwards, either because I had to leave to work on another film or refused to make those changes that Lucio demanded. That was the reason for our arguments."

The House by the Cemetery was shot on location in New York City, Boston, and Concord, Massachusetts. The film was also shot in studios at De Paolis In.Co.R. Studios in Rome. Shooting the film took eight weeks between 16 March and May 1981. The film was made on a budget of approximately 600 million Italian lire. Despite the credits stating that the special make-up effects were provided by Giannetto di Rossi and Maurizio Trani, only Trani worked on the film.

Release
The Italian ratings board asked for a brief six-second cut in The House by the Cemetery where Dagmar Lassander's character Laura Gittleson is murdered; ironically, Fulci obliged only because of his dissatisfaction with the effects in certain shots. The film opened in Turin on 14 August 1981, and was distributed in Italy by Medusa Distribuzione. The film grossed a total of 1,407,981,297 lire in Italy, making it Fulci's most financially successful horror film of the 1980s. Prior to the film's theatrical release in France, it was shown at the Festival International du film fantastique et de science-fiction in Paris alongside Fulci's earlier film The Black Cat. It was released in France on 24 March 1982 and in the United States on 1 March 1984. The American trailer was narrated by the noted monologuist Brother Theodore.

The film was released in the United Kingdom on 15 October 1982 where it was distributed by Eagle Films. The film was passed with cuts by the BBFC involving scenes being trimmed involving Ann and Laura's murders which gave the film a 84-minute and 49 second running time. This version of the film was released on home video in the UK and was later placed on the video nasties list after the Video Recordings Act 1984. It was re-released on home video in 1988 with four minutes and eleven seconds of the film cut. The film was re-released on 29 May 2001 with only 33 seconds cut and again in 2009 uncut.

It was re-released by Blue Underground on Blu-ray and DVD on 25 October 2011 with a new 2K transfer.

Critical reception 
From contemporary reviews, Julian Petley of Monthly Film Bulletin commented that the film had a "Frankenstein theme" but that "the film adds little to the well-worked legend" and that "this would matter less were the film visually richer, but for the most part it is comparatively sober and restrained, at least by Fulci standards" Petley continued that "the film undeniably has its moments–Bob's escape from the cellar; the human debris of Freudstein's laboratory; an attack by a particularly ferocious and tenacious bat; the climactic appearance of the horribly mutated Freudstein" Giovanna Grassi of Corriere della Sera dismissed it as an "Italian Shining" and concluded it to be "a condensation of rip-offs, commonplaces and badly repeated horror conventions." Aldo Vigano of La Stampa commented on the use of children in the film, stating that "to see children involved in such a gruesome and oppressive horror story will perhaps cause disconcert and discomfort, rather than pity in many spectators." In France, Philippe Ross of  La Revue du cinéma proclaimed that Fulci had to show "us something other than these endless scenes of butchery who truly become more and more painful and soporific" Christophe Gans reviewed the film in L'Écran fantastique stated that "Except for two or three welcome details [...] the suspense "for laughter", so appreciated by American filmmakers, here becomes particularly tedious" Gans praised the films visuals, noting "melancholic, wintery photography" while still concluding that the film's "repertoire of gimmicks repeated or borrowed from Argento, our greatest regrets is the absence of madness in the explanation of the monster, yelled amid the din of a stretched suspense."

From retrospective reviews, film review aggregator Rotten Tomatoes reported an approval rating of 45%, based on 11 reviews, with an average rating of 4.50/10. Time Out called the film "a hack-work of almost awesome incoherence". AllMovie praised the film, complimenting its atmosphere.

References

Footnotes

Sources

External links 
 

1981 horror films
1981 films
1980s supernatural horror films
Italian zombie films
1980s Italian-language films
English-language Italian films
1980s English-language films
Films directed by Lucio Fulci
Haunted house films
Italian splatter films
Films about surgeons
Films set in Boston
Films set in cemeteries
Films set in country houses
Films set in New York City
Films shot in Boston
Films shot in Massachusetts
Films shot in New York City
Films shot in Rome
Italian supernatural horror films
Video nasties
1981 multilingual films
Italian multilingual films
1980s Italian films